Mothering Sunday is a 2021 British romantic drama film directed by Eva Husson, from a screenplay by Alice Birch, based on the novel of the same name by Graham Swift. The film stars Odessa Young, Josh O'Connor, Olivia Colman and Colin Firth. The film also marks the first appearance of Academy Award winner Glenda Jackson in a theatrical release in over 30 years, having last appeared in King of the Wind (1990).

Set in the wake of World War I, the film follows the life of Jane Fairchild (Young), an orphaned maidservant who spends Mothering Sunday with her wealthy lover.

Mothering Sunday had its world premiere at the Cannes Film Festival on 9 July 2021.

Plot
Jane Fairchild is a maidservant who, between the wars, works for the wealthy Niven family. On Mothering Sunday Jane is given the day off to spend as she likes. To her surprise Paul Sheringham, the son of wealthy neighbours, invites her to spend the day with him while his parents, with the Nivens, and the Hobdays have lunch together.

Paul and Jane have been having a secret sexual affair for years, since Jane's arrival at the Nivens’s estate; however, Paul is due to marry Emma Hobday, a woman in his social circle who was once unofficially engaged to Paul's friend James Niven, who died in the Great War. Both Paul and Emma have mixed feelings about their engagement but feel compelled to marry nevertheless.

At the Sheringham estate, Jane and Paul have sex before Paul leaves late to join his family and fiancée for lunch. He leaves Jane alone at his estate and she wanders naked through the house examining how he lives, before leaving.

In a time-shift, in her life Jane becomes a writer and marries Donald, a philosopher whom she meets while working at a book shop. He asks her how she became a writer and she lists her birth and the gift of a typewriter as two initiating incidents, keeping the third to herself.

The third incident occurred on Mothering Sunday after Jane returned home. She meets Godfrey Niven, who tells her that Paul has died in a car crash. He asks Jane to accompany him to Paul's home, where Mr. Niven suspects there might have been a suicide note. The maid there has returned early and has cleaned up all traces of Paul and Jane's tryst. There was no note. 

Later in their marriage Jane and Donald learn that Donald has cancer and is dying. He tells her that his death will perhaps fuel her to write her best work and laments that he will be unable to read it. Before he dies Donald begs Jane to tell him about the third incident but she instead tells him she loves him.

Years later when she is an old woman Jane is approached by members of the press after she wins a prestigious literary award. She is unimpressed as she has already won all the available literary prizes.

Cast
 Odessa Young as Jane Fairchild
 Glenda Jackson as older Jane Fairchild
 Josh O'Connor as Paul Sheringham
 Olivia Colman as Mrs. Clarrie Niven
 Colin Firth as Mr. Godfrey Niven
 Sope Dirisu as Donald
 Patsy Ferran as Milly
 Emma D'Arcy as Emma Hobday
 Simon Shepherd as Mr. Giles Hobday
 Caroline Harker as Mrs. Sylvia Hobday
 Emily Woof as Mrs. Sheringham
 Craig Crosbie as Mr. Sheringham
 Albert Welling as Mr. Paxton, bookstore owner

Production
In June 2020, it was announced Odessa Young, Josh O'Connor, Olivia Colman and Colin Firth had joined the cast of the film, with Eva Husson directing from a screenplay by Alice Birch. In September 2020, Sope Dirisu joined the cast of the film, with Lionsgate set to distribute in the United Kingdom.

Principal photography began in September 2020. In May 2021, it was reported that Glenda Jackson would appear in the film.

Release
In September 2020, Sony Pictures Classics acquired U.S. distribution rights to the film.

Mothering Sunday had its world premiere at the Cannes Film Festival on 9 July 2021. It will have its US premiere at the Hamptons International Film Festival. It was scheduled to be released in the United States on 19 November 2021, but that date was changed and it opened on March 25, 2022.

Reception
On the review aggregator website Rotten Tomatoes, the film holds an approval rating of 77% based on 133 reviews, with an average rating of 6.7/10. The website's consensus reads, "Mothering Sunday works at a frustratingly chilly remove, but involving performances and solid overall craft mean it's rarely less than engaging." On Metacritic, the film has a weighted average score of 66 out of 100, based on 30 critics, indicating "generally favorable reviews".

At the 2021 Cinéfest Sudbury International Film Festival, it won the award for Outstanding Female-Led Feature.

References

External links
 

2021 films
2021 romantic drama films
British romantic drama films
Number 9 Films films
Films about interclass romance
Film4 Productions films
Films produced by Elizabeth Karlsen
Sony Pictures Classics films
Films directed by Eva Husson
2020s English-language films
2020s British films